The Man Who Saw Tomorrow is a lost 1922 American silent drama film directed by Alfred E. Green and written by Frank Condon, Will M. Ritchey, and Perley Poore Sheehan. The film stars Thomas Meighan, Theodore Roberts, Leatrice Joy, Alan Roscoe, Alec B. Francis, June Elvidge, and Eva Novak. The film was released on October 29, 1922, by Paramount Pictures.

Cast 
Thomas Meighan as Burke Hammond
Theodore Roberts as Captain Morgan Pring
Leatrice Joy as Rita Pring
Alan Roscoe as Jim McLeod 
Alec B. Francis as Sir William De Vry 
June Elvidge as Lady Helen Deene
Eva Novak as Vonia
Larry Wheat as Larry Camden 
John Miltern as Professor Jansen
Robert Brower as Bishop
Edward Patrick as Botsu
Jacqueline Dyrese as Maya

References

External links 

 
Film still at silentera.com

1922 films
1920s English-language films
Silent American drama films
1922 drama films
Paramount Pictures films
Films directed by Alfred E. Green
American black-and-white films
Lost American films
American silent feature films
1922 lost films
Lost drama films
1920s American films